Attorney General Norton may refer to:

Fletcher Norton, 1st Baron Grantley (1716–1789), Attorney General for England and Wales
Gale Norton (born 1954), Attorney General of Colorado

See also
General Norton (disambiguation)